The 1973 Minnesota Golden Gophers baseball team represented the University of Minnesota in the 1973 NCAA University Division baseball season. The head coach was Dick Siebert, serving his 26th year.

The Golden Gophers lost the College World Series, defeated by the USC Trojans in the semi-finals.

Roster

Schedule 

! style="" | Regular Season
|- valign="top" 

|- align="center" bgcolor="#ccffcc"
| 1 || March || at  || Unknown • Unknown, Texas || 7–6 || 1–0 || 0–0
|- align="center" bgcolor="#ffcccc"
| 2 || March || at Trinity || Unknown • Unknown, Texas || 3–5 || 1–1 || 0–0
|- align="center" bgcolor="#ccffcc"
| 3 || March || at  || Unknown • Unknown, Texas || 13–4 || 2–1 || 0–0
|- align="center" bgcolor="#ccffcc"
| 4 || March || at Texas Lutheran || Unknown • Unknown, Texas || 17–0 || 3–1 || 0–0
|- align="center" bgcolor="#ffcccc"
| 5 || March 26 || at Texas || Clark Field • Austin, Texas || 2–3 || 3–2 || 0–0
|- align="center" bgcolor="#ffcccc"
| 6 || March 26 || at Texas || Clark Field • Austin, Texas || 8–13 || 3–3 || 0–0
|- align="center" bgcolor="#ffcccc"
| 7 || March 27 || at  || Travis Field • College Station, Texas || 2–3 || 3–4 || 0–0
|- align="center" bgcolor="#ffcccc"
| 8 || March 27 || at Texas A&M || Travis Field • College Station, Texas || 1–4 || 3–5 || 0–0
|- align="center" bgcolor="#ffcccc"
| 9 || March 28 || at Texas A&M || Travis Field • College Station, Texas || 3–4 || 3–6 || 0–0
|- align="center" bgcolor="#ffcccc"
| 10 || March 28 || at Texas A&M || Travis Field • College Station, Texas || 2–3 || 3–7 || 0–0
|-

|- align="center" bgcolor="#ffcccc"
| 11 || April || at  || Holleman Field • Huntsville, Texas || 1–3 || 3–8 || 0–0
|- align="center" bgcolor="#ffcccc"
| 12 || April || at Sam Houston State || Holleman Field • Huntsville, Texas || 3–6 || 3–9 || 0–0
|- align="center" bgcolor="#ccffcc"
| 13 || April ||  || Bierman Field • Minneapolis, Minnesota || 18–1 || 4–9 || 0–0
|- align="center" bgcolor="#ccffcc"
| 14 || April || Augsburg || Bierman Field • Minneapolis, Minnesota || 21–0 || 5–9 || 0–0
|- align="center" bgcolor="#ccffcc"
| 15 || April ||  || Bierman Field • Minneapolis, Minnesota || 8–4 || 6–9 || 0–0
|- align="center" bgcolor="#bbbbbb"
| 16 || April || St. Cloud State || Bierman Field • Minneapolis, Minnesota || 4–4 || 6–9–1 || 0–0
|- align="center" bgcolor="#ccffcc"
| 17 || April ||  || Bierman Field • Minneapolis, Minnesota || 8–0 || 7–9–1 || 0–0
|- align="center" bgcolor="#ccffcc"
| 18 || April || St. Olaf || Bierman Field • Minneapolis, Minnesota || 6–0 || 8–9–1 || 0–0
|- align="center" bgcolor="#ccffcc"
| 19 || April || vs  || Unknown • Unknown || 14–4 || 9–9–1 || 1–0
|- align="center" bgcolor="#ffcccc"
| 20 || April || vs Iowa || Unknown • Unknown || 3–4 || 9–10–1 || 1–1
|- align="center" bgcolor="#ffcccc"
| 21 || April || vs  || Bierman Field • Minneapolis, Minnesota || 3–4 || 9–11–1 || 1–1
|- align="center" bgcolor="#bbbbbb"
| 22 || April || vs Winona State || Bierman Field • Minneapolis, Minnesota || 3–3 || 9–11–2 || 1–1
|- align="center" bgcolor="#ccffcc"
| 23 || April 20 || at  || Ray Fisher Stadium • Ann Arbor, Michigan || 6–2 || 10–11–2 || 2–1
|- align="center" bgcolor="#ffcccc"
| 24 || April 20 || at Michigan || Ray Fisher Stadium • Ann Arbor, Michigan || 0–1 || 10–12–2 || 2–2
|- align="center" bgcolor="#ffcccc"
| 25 || April 21 || at  || John H. Kobs Field • East Lansing, Michigan || 1–5 || 10–13–2 || 2–3
|- align="center" bgcolor="#ccffcc"
| 26 || April 21 || at Michigan State || John H. Kobs Field • East Lansing, Michigan || 7–1 || 11–13–2 || 3–3
|- align="center" bgcolor="#ccffcc"
| 27 || April 27 ||  || Bierman Field • Minneapolis, Minnesota || 6–4 || 12–13–2 || 4–3
|- align="center" bgcolor="#ffcccc"
| 28 || April 27 || Indiana || Bierman Field • Minneapolis, Minnesota || 5–7 || 12–14–2 || 4–4
|- align="center" bgcolor="#ccffcc"
| 29 || April 28 ||  || Bierman Field • Minneapolis, Minnesota || 7–2 || 13–14–2 || 5–4
|- align="center" bgcolor="#ccffcc"
| 30 || April 28 || Ohio State || Bierman Field • Minneapolis, Minnesota || 12–0 || 14–14–2 || 6–4
|-

|- align="center" bgcolor="#ccffcc"
| 31 || May || at  || Wells Field • Evanston, Illinois || 7–3 || 15–14–2 || 7–4
|- align="center" bgcolor="#ccffcc"
| 32 || May || at Northwestern || Wells Field • Evanston, Illinois || 8–6 || 16–14–2 || 8–4
|- align="center" bgcolor="#ccffcc"
| 33 || May || at  || Guy Lowman Field • Madison, Wisconsin || 5–1 || 17–14–2 || 9–4
|- align="center" bgcolor="#ccffcc"
| 34 || May || at Wisconsin || Guy Lowman Field • Madison, Wisconsin || 6–0 || 18–14–2 || 10–4
|- align="center" bgcolor="#ccffcc"
| 35 || May ||  || Bierman Field • Minneapolis, Minnesota || 7–0 || 19–14–2 || 9–4
|- align="center" bgcolor="#ccffcc"
| 36 || May || Mankato State || Bierman Field • Minneapolis, Minnesota || 11–0 || 20–14–2 || 10–4
|- align="center" bgcolor="#ccffcc"
| 37 || May ||  || Bierman Field • Minneapolis, Minnesota || 2–0 || 21–14–2 || 10–4
|- align="center" bgcolor="#ccffcc"
| 38 || May || Wisconsin–La Crosse || Bierman Field • Minneapolis, Minnesota || 14–3 || 22–14–2 || 10–4
|- align="center" bgcolor="#ccffcc"
| 39 || May 18 ||  || Bierman Field • Minneapolis, Minnesota || 7–0 || 23–14–2 || 11–4
|- align="center" bgcolor="#ccffcc"
| 40 || May 18 || Purdue || Bierman Field • Minneapolis, Minnesota || 15–4 || 24–14–2 || 12–4
|- align="center" bgcolor="#ccffcc"
| 41 || May 19 ||  || Bierman Field • Minneapolis, Minnesota || 7–6 || 25–14–2 || 13–4
|- align="center" bgcolor="#ccffcc"
| 42 || May 19 || Illinois || Bierman Field • Minneapolis, Minnesota || 10–3 || 26–14–2 || 14–4
|-

|-
|-
! style="" | Postseason
|- valign="top"

|- align="center" bgcolor="#ccffcc"
| 43 || May 31 || vs  || Abe Martin Field • Carbondale, Illinois || 3–2 || 27–14–2 || 14–4
|- align="center" bgcolor="#ccffcc"
| 44 || June 1 || at  || Abe Martin Field • Carbondale, Illinois || 2–0 || 28–14–2 || 14–4
|- align="center" bgcolor="#ccffcc"
| 45 || June 3 || at Southern Illinois || Abe Martin Field • Carbondale, Illinois || 7–6 || 29–14–2 || 14–4
|- valign="top"

|- align="center" bgcolor="#ccffcc"
| 46 || June 8 || vs  || Johnny Rosenblatt Stadium • Omaha, Nebraska || 1–0 || 30–14–2 || 14–4
|- align="center" bgcolor="#ffcccc"
| 47 || June 10 || vs Arizona State || Johnny Rosenblatt Stadium • Omaha, Nebraska || 0–3 || 30–15–2 || 14–4
|- align="center" bgcolor="#ccffcc"
| 48 || June 11 || vs  || Johnny Rosenblatt Stadium • Omaha, Nebraska || 6–2 || 31–15–2 || 14–4
|- align="center" bgcolor="#ffcccc"
| 49 || June 12 || vs USC || Johnny Rosenblatt Stadium • Omaha, Nebraska || 7–8 || 31–16–2 || 14–4
|-

|-
|

Awards and honors 
Tim Grice
 First Team All-Big Ten

Dave Winfield
 First Team All-Big Ten
 College World Series Most Outstanding Player

References 

Minnesota Golden Gophers baseball seasons
Minnesota Golden Gophers baseball
Big Ten Conference baseball champion seasons
Minnesota
College World Series seasons